Calacoto (hispanicized spelling) or Qalaqutu (Aymara qala stone, qutu pile, heap, "stone pile") is a neighborhood in La Paz Municipality, Bolivia.  It is located in the southern part of the city and is considered one of the largest residential zones due to the cost of the houses and the services available.  The population in this neighborhood has a medium to high income level. The zone is located about 15 kilometers from downtown.  Calacoto is located in the central zone of the Zona Sur which is considered the biggest residential area in the country along with Santa Cruz De La Sierra’s Equipetrol and Cochabamba’s Cala Cala.

The demographics of Calacoto are Catholic white and mestizo (Spanish and other European with Aymara and Quechua descent) with middle to high socioeconomic status from all ages.

References 

La Paz